Louis J. Tullio (May 17, 1916 -– April 17, 1990) was the Mayor of Erie, Pennsylvania, for six terms from 1966 until 1989. He was the first Italian-American elected to this position.

Biography
Tullio had a childhood goal of becoming Mayor of Erie. He graduated from the College of the Holy Cross in Worcester, Massachusetts, on a football scholarship, and received a master's degree in education from Boston University. After serving in the Navy in the South Pacific during World War II, he opened a restaurant in Erie and became a high school teacher and football coach, including as head coach of the professional Erie Vets franchise. He lost the 1965 Democratic primary for mayor to Mike Cannavino, who died 11 days before the general election. This allowed Tullio to replace Cannavino on the ballot and defeat Republican incumbent Charles Williamson.

As mayor, Tullio was credited with helping slow Erie's decline as a manufacturing town and preserving it as a port city and commercial center. Regardless, during his long administration, the city of Erie declined in population and was plagued by urban deterioration. He easily won re-election five times, and unsuccessfully ran for Congress in 1976. 
      
In October 1987, Tullio was diagnosed with amyloidosis, a rare disease that also struck then-Pittsburgh mayor Richard Caliguiri and then-Pennsylvania governor Robert P. Casey. Despite his illness, which forced him to cut back on his workload and schedule, Tullio stayed in office and did not appoint an acting mayor until November 12, 1989, shortly before the end of his term. He eventually succumbed to his illness in his home on April 17, 1990.

Legacy
The Louis J. Tullio Plaza, comprising Jerry Uht Park, Erie Insurance Arena, and the Warner Theatre, is named after him.

References

Further reading
deCourcy Hinds, Michael. "Erie Journal; A Mayor For Whom The Office Equals Life." The New York Times 27 Oct 1989, late ed.: A12.
AP. "Ailing Mayor of Erie Resigns." The New York Times 12 Nov 1989, late ed.: A28.

External links
 

1916 births
1990 deaths
20th-century American politicians
Boston University School of Education alumni
College of the Holy Cross alumni
Gannon Golden Knights football coaches
Gannon Golden Knights men's basketball coaches
Mayors of Erie, Pennsylvania
Deaths from amyloidosis
Sportspeople from Erie, Pennsylvania
Players of American football from Pennsylvania
Coaches of American football from Pennsylvania
American people of Italian descent